Ch. Sanjeev Beniwal (born 15 August 1966) is a politician from Rajasthan affiliated to the Bharatiya Janata Party and a two-time Member of Rajasthan Legislative Assembly (1998 and 2013). He was born to Ch. Daya Ram Beniwal (Ex. MLA and Ex. BDC Chairman) and Smt. Saraswati Devi in a village Gandhi Bari of Bhadra tehsil, Hanumangarh district.

Political career 
Ch. Sanjeev Beniwal from his early days in college was involved in movements and protests in support of student’s rights. He also conducted various campaigns against the autocratic decisions of the governments and authorities.

He started with electoral political career at an early age by contesting in the 1998 Rajasthan Legislative Assembly Elections from Bhadra constituency on Congress’s ticket and was victorious. This was the first time in 30 years in Bhadra constituency that a Congress candidate had won. 

Being actively contesting elections (2003 and 2008) and facing various ups and downs he was again victorious in the 2013 Rajasthan Legislative Assembly Elections from Bhadra with  Bharatiya Janata Party’s ticket. Creating another record with this victory of being the first MLA affiliated to BJP in the history of Bhadra.

In the tenure of 2013 – 2018 he was also the part of Committee on Local Bodies and Panchayati Raj Institutions as a member. Through this committee various decisions and aspects are covered pertaining to the local bodies and Panchayati Raj institutions of the state.

References 

1966 births
Rajasthan MLAs 1998–2003
Rajasthan MLAs 2013–2018
Indian National Congress politicians from Rajasthan
Bharatiya Janata Party politicians from Rajasthan
People from Hanumangarh district
Living people